Peter Colotka (10 January 1925–20 April 2019) was a Slovak academic, lawyer and politician. He was the Prime Minister of the Slovak Socialist Republic from 1969 to 1988.

Early life and education
Colotka was born in Sedliacka Dubová, Dolný Kubín district, on 10 January 1925. He studied law at Comenius University in Bratislava and graduated in 1950.

Career
Following his graduation Colotka joined the University of Bratislava and taught civil and family law. He was the prorector of the university from 1959 to 1961. He served at the International Court of Justice at the Hague from 1963 to 1968. He became a professor of civil law in 1964.

He was a member of both the Communist Party of Czechoslovakia and the Slovak Communist Party. He was made deputy prime minister of Czechoslovakia in 1968 and was appointed president of the Czechoslovak Federal Assembly in the meeting of the Czech communist party held on 16–17 January 1969, replacing Josef Smrkovský in the post. And Colotka was a deputy at the Assembly from 1969 to 1989. He became a member of the Czechoslovak Communist Party's presidium in April 1969 and of its central committee in May 1971. He was elected to the Slovak Communist Party's presidium in May 1969 and to the central committee in May 1971.

He was appointed prime minister of the Slovak Socialist Republic on 4 May 1969, replacing Stefan Sádovský in the post. He also served as deputy prime minister of Czechoslovakia from 1969 to 1988. He resigned from premiership on 12 October 1988 and was replaced by Ivan Knotek in the post. Colotka also resigned from the Czechoslovak Communist Party's presidium in October 1988.

He was appointed Czechoslovak ambassador to France in late 1988 and served in the post until 19 January 1990.

Controversy
Colotka was among the communist leaders who were interrogated about their role in the 1968 Soviet invasion. On 11 July 1990, Colotka was arrested and accused of embezzlement, abuse of power and theft.

Death
Peter Colotka died at age 94 on 20 April 2019.

References

External links

1925 births
2019 deaths
Ambassadors of Czechoslovakia to France
Comenius University alumni
Communist Party of Slovakia (1939) politicians
Czechoslovak judges of United Nations courts and tribunals
Czechoslovak lawyers
Government ministers of Czechoslovakia
International Court of Justice judges
Members of the Central Committee of the Communist Party of Czechoslovakia
Members of the Chamber of the Nations of Czechoslovakia (1969–1971)
Members of the Chamber of the Nations of Czechoslovakia (1971–1976)
Members of the Chamber of the Nations of Czechoslovakia (1976–1981)
Members of the Chamber of the Nations of Czechoslovakia (1981–1986)
Members of the Chamber of the Nations of Czechoslovakia (1986–1990)
People from Dolný Kubín District
People of the Cold War
Prime Ministers of Slovakia